The men's field hockey event at the 1962 Asian Games was the second edition of the field hockey event for men at the Asian Games.

It was held at the Senayan Hockey Stadium in Jakarta, Indonesia from 25 August to 3 September 1962. In this tournament, 9 teams played in the men's competition.

The defending champions Pakistan won its second gold medal by defeating India 2–0 in the final. Malaya won its first-ever medal by defeating Japan 2–0 in the bronze medal match.

Medalists

Draw
The draw for hockey competition was held on 14 August 1962.

Group A

Group B

Results

Preliminary round

Group A

Group B

Medal round

Semi-finals

Bronze medal match

Gold medal match

Final standings

References

External links
 Results

 
1962 Asian Games events
1962
Asian Games
1962 Asian Games